Wanted is a 2004 Indian Malayalam-language thriller film directed by newcomer Murali Nagavally and written by Priyadarshan. The films stars five newcomers: Madhu Warrier, Aravindan, Anniyappan, Nishanth Sagar, and Suchitra. The film is a remake of the Telugu film Aithe (2003). Mohanlal made a cameo appearance in the film.

Plot
Five unemployed youngsters plan a heist. Don Muhammed Ibrahim comes to the city where the youngsters are. How Narayana Swamy IPS brings the youngsters to justice forms the rest of the story.

Cast

Madhu Warrier as Unni
Aravindan as Nandu 
Aniyappan as Chupran 
Nishanth Sagar as Mani
Suchitra as Anu
Jagathy Sreekumar
Sreenivasan
Vijayaraghavan
 Innocent
 Bharath Gopi as Anu's father
 Venu Nagavally
 Captain Raju
 Vijayakumar
 Sukumari
KPAC Lalitha
 Manka Mahesh
Mohanlal as Narayana Swamy IPS (cameo appearance)

Production
Murali Nagavally, who worked as an assistant to Priyadarshan, made his directorial debut with this film. Newcomers Madhu Warrier, Nishanth Sagar, Aravind, Anniyappan and Suchitha were cast in the lead. Mohanlal, who promised Nagavally that he will star in his directorial debut, made a cameo appearance as a police officer.

Themes and influences
The film took into account the growing interests of the middle class in Kerala.

Soundtrack
Music by Deepak Chatterjee and lyrics by Gireesh Puthencherry.
"Changueduthukattiyal" - Anvar
"Kallayipuzha" - Vineeth Sreenivasan, Aparna Jayan
"Mizhithamara Poovil" - M. G. Sreekumar, Aparna Jayan
"Omale Nee"  - M. G. Sreekumar
"Pon Veyile" -  M. G. Sreekumar
"Shlokam" -  M. G. Sreekumar
"Title Song" - Thara Thomas

Release and reception
The film had a good opening at the box office thanks to the positive word of mouth and Mohanlal's cameo. The film released alongside Mayilattam and Kakkakarumban. 

A critic from Sify gave the film a verdict of "good" and opined that "Director Murali has made the film like a Hollywood thriller. He has been able to extract powerful performances from the four young actors. Madhu Warrier is promising and Suchitha, a spitting image of Meera Jasmine is likeable. Anniyapan has scored in the comedy scenes".

References

External links
 

2000s Malayalam-language films
2004 crime thriller films
2004 films
Indian crime thriller films
Malayalam remakes of Telugu films